Louis Jérôme Reiche (20 December 1799, Gorinchem, Netherlands – 16 May 1890, Neuilly-sur-Seine), was a French merchant, manufacturer and entomologist.

Reiche travelled widely in Europe making a large insect collection principally of beetles. He wrote 65 scientific papers and was a founder of the Société entomologique de France  becoming president on six occasions. Reiche was a merchant and manufacturer in Paris but suffered from severe losses at the time of the war of 1870, and had to sell his collection and  library.

Sources
Edward Oliver Essig (1931). A History of Entomology. Mac Millan (New York) : vii + 1029 p. 
Jean Gouillard (2004). Histoire des entomologistes français, 1750–1950. Édition entièrement revue et augmentée. Boubée (Paris) : 287 p.

1799 births
1890 deaths
French entomologists
Presidents of the Société entomologique de France
People from Gorinchem
Businesspeople from Gorinchem